Milesia vespoides is a species of hoverfly in the family Syrphidae.

Distribution
Malaysia.

References

Insects described in 1857
Eristalinae
Diptera of Asia
Taxa named by Francis Walker (entomologist)